The Chebucto Peninsula is a peninsula located in central Nova Scotia, Canada, entirely within the Halifax Regional Municipality on the Atlantic coast.

It is bordered by St. Margarets Bay in the west, the open Atlantic Ocean to the south, and Halifax Harbour (including Bedford Basin) to the east.  The peninsula also includes a sub-peninsula - the Halifax Peninsula.

The majority of the central part of the Chebucto Peninsula is uninhabited and designated a protected wilderness area to prevent encroaching urban sprawl development.

References 

 Planning District 5 (Chebucto Peninsula) Plan Area

Landforms of Halifax, Nova Scotia
Peninsulas of Nova Scotia
Landforms of Halifax County, Nova Scotia